The 2015 1. deild kvinnur was the 31st season of women's league football in the Faroe Islands.

The season was played between 21 March 2015 and 10 October 2015. The defending champions were KÍ, who successfully defended their title for the 15th year running. It was KÍ 17th league title overall and qualified them to play the 2016–17 UEFA Women's Champions League.

Format
In contrast to last season, just five teams played in the league, as AB and B36 merged. In order to have the same number of matches, the teams played each other five times in the season. Thus each team had 20 matches.

Teams
The 2015 season consisted of the following teams.

League table

Results

Top scorers

External links
1. deild kvinnur 2015 at FSF website 
1. Deild Women 2015 at Soccerway

1. deild kvinnur seasons
Faroe Islands
 Faroe Islands
women
2015 in Faroe Islands football